Etobema is a genus of moths in the subfamily Lymantriinae. The genus was erected by Francis Walker in 1865.

Species
Etobema antra (Swinhoe, 1903) New Guinea
Etobema circumdata Walker, 1865 New Guinea
Etobema eleuterioides (Semper, 1899) Philippines (Luzon)
Etobema forbesi (H. Druce, 1899) New Guinea
Etobema fusciapicalis (Rothschild, 1915) New Guinea
Etobema melanophleps (Collenette, 1930) New Guinea
Etobema rotundata (Rothschild, 1915) New Guinea

References

Lymantriinae
Noctuoidea genera